American Dad! is an American animated sitcom created by Seth MacFarlane, Mike Barker, and Matt Weitzman that debuted on February 6, 2005 for the Fox Broadcasting Company. Set in the fictional town of Langley Falls, Virginia, the series centers on the eccentric Smith family. The Smith family consists of title character Stan, Francine, Hayley, Steve, Roger (an alien whom Stan has rescued from government capture and harbors in the family's attic), Jeff Fischer (Hayley's boyfriend, now husband), and Klaus (the family's pet who is really an East German man trapped by the CIA in a fish's body).

The series' 11th season was its final season to air on Fox. The show moved to the cable network TBS beginning with the 12th season. On January 15, 2020, the show was renewed for seasons 18 and 19. The 19th season premiered on January 24, 2022. On December 16, 2021, the series was renewed for seasons 20 and 21. The 20th season is scheduled to premiere on March 27, 2023.

Some sources disagree with the season numbering given here on Wikipedia. For details, see Season number discrepancies.



Series overview

Episode list

Season 1 (2005)

Season 2 (2005–06)

Season 3 (2006–07)

Season 4 (2007–08)

Season 5 (2008–09)

Season 6 (2009–10)

This is the first season of American Dad! to be broadcast in High Definition starting with the 5AJNxx production line (Episode 10) in midseason 2010.

Season 7 (2010–11)

Season 8 (2011–12)

Season 9 (2012–13)

Season 10 (2013–14)

Season 11 (2014)

Season 12 (2014–15)

Season 13 (2016)

Season 14 (2016–17)

Season 15 (2017–19)

Season 16 (2019–20)

Season 17 (2020)

Season 18 (2021)

Season 19 (2022)

Season 20 (2023)

Notes

References 

General references

External links 
 American Dad! at TBS.com
American Dad! at AdultSwim.com
 
 epguides.com American Dad! list of episodes

 
American Dad!
American Dad!